Jean-Louis Gagnaire (born April 29, 1956 in Saint-Étienne, Loire) was a member of the National Assembly of France from 2007 to 2017.  He represented Loire's 2nd constituency, as a member of the Socialiste, radical, citoyen et divers gauche.

References

1956 births
Living people
Politicians from Saint-Étienne
Socialist Party (France) politicians
Deputies of the 13th National Assembly of the French Fifth Republic
Deputies of the 14th National Assembly of the French Fifth Republic